What Is Love is a 2012 Taiwanese romantic-comedy television series. The television drama was produced by Bethel Video Productions Ltd, starring Wu Kang-jen and Jade Chou. The shooting began on April 9, 2012, and first aired on July 20, 2012 on TTV.

Plot
Thirty-two-year-old Li Yi Hua (Jade Chou) is longing for a romantic relationship and wants to marry a good man. Along comes Bai Zong You (Chris Wu), who breaks women's hearts with one-night stands. Bai Zong You sets his sights on wooing Li Yi Hua next. What she doesn't know is that she might have true feels for him.

Cast
The following are the cast of What Is Love series:

Main
Wu Kang-jen as Bai Zong You 
Jade Chou as Li Yi Hua 
Duncan Lai as Zhang Shao Qian 
Kimi Hsia as Wu Xiao Lu

Supporting
Jin Qin as Wu Xiao Gui 
Luo Ping as Ai Lei Di 
Gina Lin as Lan Jun 
Andrew Tan as Yan Zu Li 
Luo Bei An as Li Yuan
Tsai Chen-nan as Wu San Bao 
Albee Hwang as Wang Xue Fu 
Cherry Hsia as Chen Yi Jing 
Xu Gui Ying as Bai Mei Gui 
Riva Chang as wedding hostess

Cameos
Johnny Lu as Meng Ke Huai (ep1)
Janel Tsai as Li Xiao Yang (ep1)
Nylon Chen as Albert (ep5)
Tender Huang as A Xiu (ep5)
Kelly Huang as Dancing instructor (eps7-8)

Broadcast

Replays

Production
Kenting Beach was used as a background scene for the opening theme of the program as well as the location of the montages used during the last episodes of the series. Various areas around Miramar Entertainment Park were used when the characters walk to and from their workplaces. Other filming locations include: Taipei City Hall, 三星張 Bed and Breakfast
Meihua Lake, Cingjing Farm, Songshan Cultural and Creative Park, Diamond Tony's Italian Bistro, The Villa Herbs Restaurant, Cingjing National Hotel, and Yue Ying Landscape Holiday Villas.

The director once had Chris Wu do a scene, in which he carries Jade Chou to the hospital, fifteen times. As a result, Wu's arms eventually got sore and his legs became so weak that Chou was accidentally hit by a wheelchair. Chou did not sustain serious injuries. During the shooting of the last scene of the last episode, Wu accidentally pulled Chou's miniskirt upwards while kissing her, causing her underwear to show up in the midst of the city.

The plush sheep doll seen in the later episodes was made specially by the production team, as it was inconvenient for them to shoot the real sheep, seen during the first episodes, on set.

Background
In an interview, Jade Chou was asked about her comparison with the character that she was playing. Then around thirty and still single, her similarity with character Li Yi Hua, who is longing for love and wanting to get married, was noted. She answered, "I am also at the stage where people would often ask me about marriage. However, I want to enjoy my life, every single bit of it, no matter if I'm already 35 years old already. Since I was too busy during my twenties, I think that I'm still missing a lot of things. I want to learn even more".

Soundtrack

The What Is Love Original Soundtrack (花是愛 電視原聲帶) was released digitally on August 3, 2012, and the CD was released on August 14, 2012 by various artists under Linfair Records. It contains twelve songs; six original songs and six instrumental versions of those songs. The opening theme song is "單身美好" or "Shining Single Life" by Claire Kuo, while the ending theme song, "再痛也沒關係" or "It Can Hurt More", is by co-actor Andrew Tan.

Track listing

Episode ratings
What Is Love ranked fourth in its pilot episode and stayed at the same spot, with the exception of its third episode, until it reached the third spot on its last episode, with a total average of 0.54. Its drama competitors were CTV's Confucius, FTV's Independent Heroes, and SETTV's Rainy Night Flower and Father's Wish. The viewers' survey was conducted by AGB Nielsen.

Notes

References

External links
 What Is Love on TTV
 What Is Love on STAR Chinese Channel
 

Taiwan Television original programming
2012 Taiwanese television series debuts
2012 Taiwanese television series endings
Taiwanese romantic comedy television series